LaRue Van Meter (1898 – December 17, 1981) was an attorney and an American football and basketball coach. He served as the head basketball coach at Illinois College in Jacksonville, Illinois from 1932 to 1938.

Van Meter was the city attorney of Falls Church, Virginia from 1948 until his retirement in 1974.

Head coaching record

References

External links
 

1898 births
1981 deaths
Illinois College Blueboys football coaches
Illinois Wesleyan University alumni
George Washington University Law School alumni
People from Sangamon County, Illinois
People from Falls Church, Virginia
Coaches of American football from Illinois
Virginia lawyers
Basketball coaches from Illinois